Edward James Dudley Newbigin (born 15 October 1931) is a former New Zealand cricketer. He played two matches of first-class cricket for Wellington in 1953–54.

Jim Newbigin attended Christ's College, Christchurch, and spent his working life in Hastings as a liquor merchant. He married Louise Walker in April 1963 and they had three children.

References

External links

 Jim Newbigin at CricketArchive

1931 births
Living people
New Zealand cricketers
Wellington cricketers
Cricketers from Hastings, New Zealand
People educated at Christ's College, Christchurch